Mysterious Object at Noon (or Dokfa nai meuman, literally Dokfa in the Devil's Hand) is a 2000 Thai independent experimental  documentary film directed by Apichatpong Weerasethakul in his feature directorial debut.

Production
The film is unscripted and uses the exquisite corpse party game as a concept, with the film crew traveling across Thailand, interviewing ordinary people and asking each person to add their own words to a story. The story is acted out and these scenes are interspersed with the interviews.

The film was shot in 16mm and enlarged to 35mm for international exhibition.

Reception

Festivals and awards
Mysterious Object at Noon premiered in January 2000 at the International Film Festival Rotterdam, having received support from the Hubert Bals Fund in 1998. It had its North American premiere at the Vancouver International Film Festival, where it won a special citation Dragons and Tigers Award. It won the Grand Prize (Woosuk Award) at the Jeonju International Film Festival, second prize and the NETPAC Special Mention Prize at the Yamagata International Documentary Film Festival. The film was screened at many other film festivals, including the London Film Festival, the Singapore International Film Festival and the Hong Kong International Film Festival.

Critical reception
Because its experimental nature falls outside the mainstream of Thai cinema, Mysterious Object at Noon received little attention in the director's native country. However, through film festival screenings overseas, the film gained positive notice from film critics.

"Mr. Weerasethakul's film is like a piece of chamber music slowly, deftly expanding into a full symphonic movement; to watch it is to enter a fugue state that has the music and rhythms of another culture. It's really a movie that requires listening, reminding us that the medium did become talking pictures at one point," said Elvis Mitchell in The New York Times.

Preservation

Mysterious Object at Noon has been restored by the Austrian Film Museum and The Film Foundation from the best surviving elements and released on DVD in 2015. and it was released in 2017 on DVD and Blu-ray by The Criterion Collection as part of the Scorsese's World Cinema Project Series No. 2 along with Lino Brocka's Insiang.

References

External links
Official site

Mysterious Object at Noon: Stories That Haunt One Another an essay by Dennis Lim at the Criterion Collection

2000 films
Thai-language films
Thai black-and-white films
Thai avant-garde and experimental films
Thai independent films
Films directed by Apichatpong Weerasethakul
Thai national heritage films
2000s avant-garde and experimental films
Films shot in 16 mm film